Ian William Robertson  (28 April 1950 – 24 August 2015) was a South African rugby union player.

Playing career
Robertson attended the Prince Edward School in Salisbury (now Harare) and in 1968 represented Rhodesia at the annual Craven Week tournament for schoolboys. The following year, as a nineteen year old, he made his debut in senior rugby for Rhodesia against South West Africa. Robertson went on to represent Rhodesia regularly from 1969 until 1979, but for two excursions in South Africa. First in 1972 when he moved to Johannesburg and only managed to make the Transvaal B team. In 1975 he moved to Cape Town and joined the Villager Football Club. He however could not secure a regular place in the Western Province team. When Robertson returned to Rhodesia at the beginning of 1976, he once again became an automatic first choice for the national side and was 1976 probably his greatest year.

At an international level, Robertson was selected to tour with the Springboks to France in 1974 and made his test debut against France on 23 November 1974 in Toulouse. He played in both test matches on the French tour and also played in five tour matches, scoring eighteen points for the Springboks. He missed out on any further test during 1975 and in 1976 he played in three of the four test matches against the touring All Black side captained by Andy Leslie.

Robertson's career was halted against Transvaal at Salisbury in 1979 when he suffered a badly broken wrist and ultimately retired for rugby. In 1985, he tried a comeback with Northern Transvaal, but only played in three provincial matches.

Test history

Accolades
Robertson was named Rhodesia's Sportsman of the Year in 1976.

See also
List of South Africa national rugby union players – Springbok no.  480

References

1950 births
2015 deaths
South Africa international rugby union players
Rhodesian rugby union players
Western Province (rugby union) players
Alumni of Prince Edward School
Blue Bulls players
Sportspeople from Harare
Rugby union centres